The Brazil national football team participated in the 1974 FIFA World Cup, and in doing so maintained their record of being the only team to enter every World Cup Finals.

Brazil finished in fourth place, having failed to top their group in the second group phase.

Qualifying

Brazil qualified as defending champions, having won the 1970 FIFA World Cup.

The Cup

First round

Group 2

Second round

Group A

Netherlands qualified for the final match, and Brazil qualified for the third place match.

Third-place match

Starting 11

|}

Goalscorers

3 goals
 Rivelino

2 goals
 Jairzinho

1 goal
 Valdomiro

External links
1974 FIFA World Cup on FIFA.com
Details at RSSSF
History of the World Cup-1974
Planet World Cup - West Germany 1974

 
Countries at the 1974 FIFA World Cup